Neretva Delta is the river delta of the Neretva, a river that flows through Bosnia and Herzegovina and Croatia and empties in the Adriatic Sea. The delta is a unique landscape in southern Croatia, and a wetland that is listed under the Ramsar Convention as internationally important, as the wetland extends into the Hutovo Blato in Herzegovina.

 ornithological reserves: Prud, Orepak, Podgredom
 ornithological and ichthyological reserve at the river mouth
 protected landscape: lake Modro oko
An additional 1200 ha of nature in the delta is not protected. In 2003, the Ministry of Environment and Spatial Planning organized a public discussion about the proposal to make the delta a nature park. In 2007, the experts from the State Institute for Nature Protection made another formal proposal for the Neretva Delta to become a nature park. A public discussion process was started but quickly terminated by the Ministry of Culture, allegedly because of protests from the local government.

References

0Neretva Delta
River deltas of Europe
Ramsar sites in Bosnia and Herzegovina
Ramsar sites in Croatia
Neretva